The following outline is provided as an overview of and topical guide to machine learning. Machine learning is a subfield of soft computing within computer science that evolved from the study of pattern recognition and computational learning theory in artificial intelligence. In 1959, Arthur Samuel defined machine learning as a "field of study that gives computers the ability to learn without being explicitly programmed". Machine learning explores the study and construction of algorithms that can learn from and make predictions on data. Such algorithms operate by building a model from an example training set of input observations in order to make data-driven predictions or decisions expressed as outputs, rather than following strictly static program instructions.

What type of thing is machine learning? 

 An academic discipline
 A branch of science
 An applied science
 A subfield of computer science
 A branch of artificial intelligence
 A subfield of soft computing
 Application of statistics

Branches of machine learning

Subfields of machine learning 

 Computational learning theory – studying the design and analysis of machine learning algorithms.
 Grammar induction
 Meta-learning

Cross-disciplinary fields involving machine learning 

 Adversarial machine learning
 Predictive analytics
 Quantum machine learning
 Robot learning
 Developmental robotics

Applications of machine learning 

 Applications of machine learning
 Bioinformatics
 Biomedical informatics
 Computer vision
 Customer relationship management –
 Data mining
 Earth sciences
 Email filtering
 Inverted pendulum – balance and equilibrium system.
 Natural language processing (NLP)
 Named Entity Recognition
 Automatic summarization
 Automatic taxonomy construction
 Dialog system
 Grammar checker
 Language recognition
 Handwriting recognition
 Optical character recognition
 Speech recognition
 Text to Speech Synthesis (TTS)
 Speech Emotion Recognition (SER)
 Machine translation
 Question answering
 Speech synthesis
 Text mining
 Term frequency–inverse document frequency (tf–idf)
 Text simplification
 Pattern recognition
 Facial recognition system
 Handwriting recognition
 Image recognition 
 Optical character recognition
 Speech recognition
 Recommendation system
 Collaborative filtering
 Content-based filtering
 Hybrid recommender systems (Collaborative and content-based filtering)
 Search engine
 Search engine optimization
 Social Engineering

Machine learning hardware 

 Graphics processing unit
 Tensor processing unit
 Vision processing unit

Machine learning tools 

 Comparison of deep learning software

Machine learning frameworks

Proprietary machine learning frameworks 

 Amazon Machine Learning
 Microsoft Azure Machine Learning Studio
 DistBelief – replaced by TensorFlow

Open source machine learning frameworks 

 Apache Singa
 Apache MXNet
 Caffe
 PyTorch 
 mlpack
 TensorFlow
 Torch
 CNTK
 Accord.Net
 Jax
 MLJ.jl – A machine learning framework for Julia

Machine learning libraries 

 Deeplearning4j
 Theano
 scikit-learn
 Keras

Machine learning algorithms 

 Almeida–Pineda recurrent backpropagation
 ALOPEX
 Backpropagation
 Bootstrap aggregating
 CN2 algorithm
 Constructing skill trees
 Dehaene–Changeux model
 Diffusion map
 Dominance-based rough set approach
 Dynamic time warping
 Error-driven learning
 Evolutionary multimodal optimization
 Expectation–maximization algorithm
 FastICA
 Forward–backward algorithm
 GeneRec
 Genetic Algorithm for Rule Set Production
 Growing self-organizing map
 Hyper basis function network
 IDistance
 K-nearest neighbors algorithm
 Kernel methods for vector output
 Kernel principal component analysis
 Leabra
 Linde–Buzo–Gray algorithm
 Local outlier factor
 Logic learning machine
 LogitBoost
 Manifold alignment
 Markov chain Monte Carlo (MCMC)
 Minimum redundancy feature selection
 Mixture of experts
 Multiple kernel learning
 Non-negative matrix factorization
 Online machine learning
 Out-of-bag error
 Prefrontal cortex basal ganglia working memory
 PVLV
 Q-learning
 Quadratic unconstrained binary optimization
 Query-level feature
 Quickprop
 Radial basis function network
 Randomized weighted majority algorithm
 Reinforcement learning
 Repeated incremental pruning to produce error reduction (RIPPER)
 Rprop
 Rule-based machine learning
 Skill chaining
 Sparse PCA
 State–action–reward–state–action
 Stochastic gradient descent
 Structured kNN
 T-distributed stochastic neighbor embedding
 Temporal difference learning
 Wake-sleep algorithm
 Weighted majority algorithm (machine learning)

Machine learning methods

Instance-based algorithm 
 K-nearest neighbors algorithm (KNN)
 Learning vector quantization (LVQ)
 Self-organizing map (SOM)

Regression analysis 
 Logistic regression
 Ordinary least squares regression (OLSR)
 Linear regression
 Stepwise regression
 Multivariate adaptive regression splines (MARS)

 Regularization algorithm
 Ridge regression
 Least Absolute Shrinkage and Selection Operator (LASSO)
 Elastic net
 Least-angle regression (LARS)
 Classifiers
 Probabilistic classifier
 Naive Bayes classifier
 Binary classifier
 Linear classifier
 Hierarchical classifier

Dimensionality reduction 

Dimensionality reduction
 Canonical correlation analysis (CCA)
 Factor analysis
 Feature extraction
 Feature selection
 Independent component analysis (ICA)
 Linear discriminant analysis (LDA)
 Multidimensional scaling (MDS)
 Non-negative matrix factorization (NMF)
 Partial least squares regression (PLSR)
 Principal component analysis (PCA)
 Principal component regression (PCR)
 Projection pursuit
 Sammon mapping
 t-distributed stochastic neighbor embedding (t-SNE)

Ensemble learning 

Ensemble learning
 AdaBoost
 Boosting
 Bootstrap aggregating (Bagging)
 Ensemble averaging – process of creating multiple models and combining them to produce a desired output, as opposed to creating just one model. Frequently an ensemble of models performs better than any individual model, because the various errors of the models "average out."
 Gradient boosted decision tree (GBDT)
 Gradient boosting machine (GBM)
 Random Forest
 Stacked Generalization (blending)

Meta-learning 

Meta-learning
 Inductive bias
 Metadata

Reinforcement learning 

Reinforcement learning
 Q-learning
 State–action–reward–state–action (SARSA)
 Temporal difference learning (TD)
 Learning Automata

Supervised learning 

Supervised learning
 Averaged one-dependence estimators (AODE)
 Artificial neural network
 Case-based reasoning
 Gaussian process regression
 Gene expression programming
 Group method of data handling (GMDH)
 Inductive logic programming
 Instance-based learning
 Lazy learning
 Learning Automata
 Learning Vector Quantization
 Logistic Model Tree
 Minimum message length (decision trees, decision graphs, etc.)
 Nearest Neighbor Algorithm
 Analogical modeling
 Probably approximately correct learning (PAC) learning
 Ripple down rules, a knowledge acquisition methodology
 Symbolic machine learning algorithms
 Support vector machines
 Random Forests
 Ensembles of classifiers
 Bootstrap aggregating (bagging)
 Boosting (meta-algorithm)
 Ordinal classification
 Information fuzzy networks (IFN)
 Conditional Random Field
 ANOVA
 Quadratic classifiers
 k-nearest neighbor
 Boosting
 SPRINT
 Bayesian networks
 Naive Bayes
 Hidden Markov models
 Hierarchical hidden Markov model

Bayesian 

Bayesian statistics
 Bayesian knowledge base
 Naive Bayes
 Gaussian Naive Bayes
 Multinomial Naive Bayes
 Averaged One-Dependence Estimators (AODE)
 Bayesian Belief Network (BBN)
 Bayesian Network (BN)

Decision tree algorithms 

Decision tree algorithm
 Decision tree
 Classification and regression tree (CART)
 Iterative Dichotomiser 3 (ID3)
 C4.5 algorithm
 C5.0 algorithm
 Chi-squared Automatic Interaction Detection (CHAID)
 Decision stump
 Conditional decision tree
 ID3 algorithm
 Random forest
 SLIQ

Linear classifier 

Linear classifier
 Fisher's linear discriminant
 Linear regression
 Logistic regression
 Multinomial logistic regression
 Naive Bayes classifier
 Perceptron
 Support vector machine

Unsupervised learning 

Unsupervised learning
 Expectation-maximization algorithm
 Vector Quantization
 Generative topographic map
 Information bottleneck method
 Association rule learning algorithms
 Apriori algorithm
 Eclat algorithm

Artificial neural networks 

Artificial neural network
 Feedforward neural network
 Extreme learning machine
 Convolutional neural network
 Recurrent neural network
 Long short-term memory (LSTM)
 Logic learning machine
 Self-organizing map

Association rule learning 

Association rule learning
 Apriori algorithm
 Eclat algorithm
 FP-growth algorithm

Hierarchical clustering 

Hierarchical clustering
 Single-linkage clustering
 Conceptual clustering

Cluster analysis 

Cluster analysis
 BIRCH
 DBSCAN
 Expectation-maximization (EM)
 Fuzzy clustering
 Hierarchical Clustering
 K-means clustering
 K-medians
 Mean-shift
 OPTICS algorithm

Anomaly detection 

Anomaly detection
 k-nearest neighbors algorithm (k-NN)
 Local outlier factor

Semi-supervised learning 

Semi-supervised learning
 Active learning – special case of semi-supervised learning in which a learning algorithm is able to interactively query the user (or some other information source) to obtain the desired outputs at new data points.
 Generative models
 Low-density separation
 Graph-based methods
 Co-training
 Transduction

Deep learning 

Deep learning
 Deep belief networks
 Deep Boltzmann machines
 Deep Convolutional neural networks
 Deep Recurrent neural networks
 Hierarchical temporal memory
 Generative Adversarial Network
 Style transfer
 Transformer
 Stacked Auto-Encoders

Other machine learning methods and problems 

 Anomaly detection
 Association rules
 Bias-variance dilemma
 Classification
 Multi-label classification
 Clustering
 Data Pre-processing
 Empirical risk minimization
 Feature engineering
 Feature learning
 Learning to rank
 Occam learning
 Online machine learning
 PAC learning
 Regression
 Reinforcement Learning
 Semi-supervised learning
 Statistical learning
 Structured prediction
 Graphical models
 Bayesian network
 Conditional random field (CRF)
 Hidden Markov model (HMM)
 Unsupervised learning
 VC theory

Machine learning research 
 List of artificial intelligence projects
 List of datasets for machine learning research

History of machine learning 

History of machine learning
 Timeline of machine learning

Machine learning projects 

Machine learning projects
 DeepMind
 Google Brain
 OpenAI
 Meta AI

Machine learning organizations 

Machine learning organizations
 Knowledge Engineering and Machine Learning Group

Machine learning conferences and workshops 

 Artificial Intelligence and Security (AISec) (co-located workshop with CCS)
 Conference on Neural Information Processing Systems (NIPS)
 ECML PKDD
 International Conference on Machine Learning (ICML)
 ML4ALL (Machine Learning For All)

Machine learning publications

Books on machine learning 

Books about machine learning

Machine learning journals 

 Machine Learning
 Journal of Machine Learning Research (JMLR)
 Neural Computation

Persons influential in machine learning 

 Alberto Broggi
 Andrei Knyazev
 Andrew McCallum
 Andrew Ng
 Anuraag Jain
 Armin B. Cremers
 Ayanna Howard
 Barney Pell
 Ben Goertzel
 Ben Taskar
 Bernhard Schölkopf
 Brian D. Ripley
 Christopher G. Atkeson
 Corinna Cortes
 Demis Hassabis
 Douglas Lenat
 Eric Xing
 Ernst Dickmanns
 Geoffrey Hinton – co-inventor of the backpropagation and contrastive divergence training algorithms
 Hans-Peter Kriegel
 Hartmut Neven
 Heikki Mannila
 Ian Goodfellow – Father of Generative & adversarial networks
 Jacek M. Zurada
 Jaime Carbonell
 Jeremy Slovak
 Jerome H. Friedman
 John D. Lafferty
 John Platt – invented SMO and Platt scaling
 Julie Beth Lovins
 Jürgen Schmidhuber
 Karl Steinbuch
 Katia Sycara
 Leo Breiman – invented bagging and random forests
 Lise Getoor
 Luca Maria Gambardella
 Léon Bottou
 Marcus Hutter
 Mehryar Mohri
 Michael Collins
 Michael I. Jordan
 Michael L. Littman
 Nando de Freitas
 Ofer Dekel
 Oren Etzioni
 Pedro Domingos
 Peter Flach
 Pierre Baldi
 Pushmeet Kohli
 Ray Kurzweil
 Rayid Ghani
 Ross Quinlan
 Salvatore J. Stolfo
 Sebastian Thrun
 Selmer Bringsjord
 Sepp Hochreiter
 Shane Legg
 Stephen Muggleton
 Steve Omohundro
 Tom M. Mitchell
 Trevor Hastie
 Vasant Honavar
 Vladimir Vapnik – co-inventor of the SVM and VC theory
 Yann LeCun – invented convolutional neural networks
 Yasuo Matsuyama
 Yoshua Bengio
 Zoubin Ghahramani

See also 

 Outline of artificial intelligence
 Outline of computer vision
 Outline of robotics

 Accuracy paradox
 Action model learning
 Activation function
 Activity recognition
 ADALINE
 Adaptive neuro fuzzy inference system
 Adaptive resonance theory
 Additive smoothing
 Adjusted mutual information
 AIVA
 AIXI
 AlchemyAPI
 AlexNet
 Algorithm selection
 Algorithmic inference
 Algorithmic learning theory
 AlphaGo
 AlphaGo Zero
 Alternating decision tree
 Apprenticeship learning
 Causal Markov condition 
 Competitive learning
 Concept learning
 Decision tree learning
 Differentiable programming
 Distribution learning theory
 Eager learning
 End-to-end reinforcement learning
 Error tolerance (PAC learning)
 Explanation-based learning
 Feature
 GloVe
 Hyperparameter
 Inferential theory of learning
 Learning automata
 Learning classifier system
 Learning rule
 Learning with errors
 M-Theory (learning framework)
 Machine learning control
 Machine learning in bioinformatics
 Margin
 Markov chain geostatistics 
 Markov chain Monte Carlo (MCMC) 
 Markov information source 
 Markov logic network 
 Markov model
 Markov random field
 Markovian discrimination 
 Maximum-entropy Markov model 
 Multi-armed bandit 
 Multi-task learning
 Multilinear subspace learning
 Multimodal learning
 Multiple instance learning
 Multiple-instance learning
 Never-Ending Language Learning
 Offline learning
 Parity learning
 Population-based incremental learning
 Predictive learning
 Preference learning
 Proactive learning
 Proximal gradient methods for learning
 Semantic analysis
 Similarity learning
 Sparse dictionary learning
 Stability (learning theory)
 Statistical learning theory
 Statistical relational learning
 Tanagra
 Transfer learning
 Variable-order Markov model 
 Version space learning
 Waffles
 Weka
 Loss function
 Loss functions for classification
 Mean squared error (MSE)
 Mean squared prediction error (MSPE)
 Taguchi loss function
 Low-energy adaptive clustering hierarchy

Other 

 Anne O'Tate
 Ant colony optimization algorithms
 Anthony Levandowski
 Anti-unification (computer science)
 Apache Flume
 Apache Giraph
 Apache Mahout
 Apache SINGA
 Apache Spark
 Apache SystemML
 Aphelion (software)
 Arabic Speech Corpus
 Archetypal analysis
 Arthur Zimek
 Artificial ants
 Artificial bee colony algorithm
 Artificial development
 Artificial immune system
 Astrostatistics
 Averaged one-dependence estimators
 Bag-of-words model
 Balanced clustering
 Ball tree
 Base rate
 Bat algorithm
 Baum–Welch algorithm
 Bayesian hierarchical modeling
 Bayesian interpretation of kernel regularization
 Bayesian optimization
 Bayesian structural time series
 Bees algorithm
 Behavioral clustering
 Bernoulli scheme
 Bias–variance tradeoff
 Biclustering
 BigML
 Binary classification
 Bing Predicts
 Bio-inspired computing
 Biogeography-based optimization
 Biplot
 Bondy's theorem
 Bongard problem
 Bradley–Terry model
 BrownBoost
 Brown clustering
 Burst error
 CBCL (MIT)
 CIML community portal
 CMA-ES
 CURE data clustering algorithm
 Cache language model
 Calibration (statistics)
 Canonical correspondence analysis
 Canopy clustering algorithm
 Cascading classifiers
 Category utility
 CellCognition
 Cellular evolutionary algorithm
 Chi-square automatic interaction detection
 Chromosome (genetic algorithm)
 Classifier chains
 Cleverbot
 Clonal selection algorithm
 Cluster-weighted modeling
 Clustering high-dimensional data
 Clustering illusion
 CoBoosting
 Cobweb (clustering)
 Cognitive computer
 Cognitive robotics
 Collostructional analysis
 Common-method variance
 Complete-linkage clustering
 Computer-automated design
 Concept class
 Concept drift
 Conference on Artificial General Intelligence
 Conference on Knowledge Discovery and Data Mining
 Confirmatory factor analysis
 Confusion matrix
 Congruence coefficient
 Connect (computer system)
 Consensus clustering
 Constrained clustering
 Constrained conditional model
 Constructive cooperative coevolution
 Correlation clustering
 Correspondence analysis
 Cortica
 Coupled pattern learner
 Cross-entropy method
 Cross-validation (statistics)
 Crossover (genetic algorithm)
 Cuckoo search
 Cultural algorithm
 Cultural consensus theory
 Curse of dimensionality
 DADiSP
 DARPA LAGR Program
 Darkforest
 Dartmouth workshop
 DarwinTunes
 Data Mining Extensions
 Data exploration
 Data pre-processing
 Data stream clustering
 Dataiku
 Davies–Bouldin index
 Decision boundary
 Decision list
 Decision tree model
 Deductive classifier
 DeepArt
 DeepDream
 Deep Web Technologies
 Defining length
 Dendrogram
 Dependability state model
 Detailed balance
 Determining the number of clusters in a data set
 Detrended correspondence analysis
 Developmental robotics
 Diffbot
 Differential evolution
 Discrete phase-type distribution
 Discriminative model
 Dissociated press
 Distributed R
 Dlib
 Document classification
 Documenting Hate
 Domain adaptation
 Doubly stochastic model
 Dual-phase evolution
 Dunn index
 Dynamic Bayesian network
 Dynamic Markov compression
 Dynamic topic model
 Dynamic unobserved effects model
 EDLUT
 ELKI
 Edge recombination operator
 Effective fitness
 Elastic map
 Elastic matching
 Elbow method (clustering)
 Emergent (software)
 Encog
 Entropy rate
 Erkki Oja
 Eurisko
 European Conference on Artificial Intelligence
 Evaluation of binary classifiers
 Evolution strategy
 Evolution window
 Evolutionary Algorithm for Landmark Detection
 Evolutionary algorithm
 Evolutionary art
 Evolutionary music
 Evolutionary programming
 Evolvability (computer science)
 Evolved antenna
 Evolver (software)
 Evolving classification function
 Expectation propagation
 Exploratory factor analysis
 F1 score
 FLAME clustering
 Factor analysis of mixed data
 Factor graph
 Factor regression model
 Factored language model
 Farthest-first traversal
 Fast-and-frugal trees
 Feature Selection Toolbox
 Feature hashing
 Feature scaling
 Feature vector
 Firefly algorithm
 First-difference estimator
 First-order inductive learner
 Fish School Search
 Fisher kernel
 Fitness approximation
 Fitness function
 Fitness proportionate selection
 Fluentd
 Folding@home
 Formal concept analysis
 Forward algorithm
 Fowlkes–Mallows index
 Frederick Jelinek
 Frrole
 Functional principal component analysis
 GATTO
 GLIMMER
 Gary Bryce Fogel
 Gaussian adaptation
 Gaussian process
 Gaussian process emulator
 Gene prediction
 General Architecture for Text Engineering
 Generalization error
 Generalized canonical correlation
 Generalized filtering
 Generalized iterative scaling
 Generalized multidimensional scaling
 Generative adversarial network
 Generative model
 Genetic algorithm
 Genetic algorithm scheduling
 Genetic algorithms in economics
 Genetic fuzzy systems
 Genetic memory (computer science)
 Genetic operator
 Genetic programming
 Genetic representation
 Geographical cluster
 Gesture Description Language
 Geworkbench
 Glossary of artificial intelligence
 Glottochronology
 Golem (ILP)
 Google matrix
 Grafting (decision trees)
 Gramian matrix
 Grammatical evolution
 Granular computing
 GraphLab
 Graph kernel
 Gremlin (programming language)
 Growth function
 HUMANT (HUManoid ANT) algorithm
 Hammersley–Clifford theorem
 Harmony search
 Hebbian theory
 Hidden Markov random field
 Hidden semi-Markov model
 Hierarchical hidden Markov model
 Higher-order factor analysis
 Highway network
 Hinge loss
 Holland's schema theorem
 Hopkins statistic
 Hoshen–Kopelman algorithm
 Huber loss
 IRCF360
 Ian Goodfellow
 Ilastik
 Ilya Sutskever
 Immunocomputing
 Imperialist competitive algorithm
 Inauthentic text
 Incremental decision tree
 Induction of regular languages
 Inductive bias
 Inductive probability
 Inductive programming
 Influence diagram
 Information Harvesting
 Information fuzzy networks
 Information gain in decision trees
 Information gain ratio
 Inheritance (genetic algorithm)
 Instance selection
 Intel RealSense
 Interacting particle system
 Interactive machine translation
 International Joint Conference on Artificial Intelligence
 International Meeting on Computational Intelligence Methods for Bioinformatics and Biostatistics
 International Semantic Web Conference
 Iris flower data set
 Island algorithm
 Isotropic position
 Item response theory
 Iterative Viterbi decoding
 JOONE
 Jabberwacky
 Jaccard index
 Jackknife variance estimates for random forest
 Java Grammatical Evolution
 Joseph Nechvatal
 Jubatus
 Julia (programming language)
 Junction tree algorithm
 K-SVD
 K-means++
 K-medians clustering
 K-medoids
 KNIME
 KXEN Inc.
 K q-flats
 Kaggle
 Kalman filter
 Katz's back-off model
 Kernel adaptive filter
 Kernel density estimation
 Kernel eigenvoice
 Kernel embedding of distributions
 Kernel method
 Kernel perceptron
 Kernel random forest
 Kinect
 Klaus-Robert Müller
 Kneser–Ney smoothing
 Knowledge Vault
 Knowledge integration
 LIBSVM
 LPBoost
 Labeled data
 LanguageWare
 Language identification in the limit
 Language model
 Large margin nearest neighbor
 Latent Dirichlet allocation
 Latent class model
 Latent semantic analysis
 Latent variable
 Latent variable model
 Lattice Miner
 Layered hidden Markov model
 Learnable function class
 Least squares support vector machine
 Leave-one-out error
 Leslie P. Kaelbling
 Linear genetic programming
 Linear predictor function
 Linear separability
 Lingyun Gu
 Linkurious
 Lior Ron (business executive)
 List of genetic algorithm applications
 List of metaphor-based metaheuristics
 List of text mining software
 Local case-control sampling
 Local independence
 Local tangent space alignment
 Locality-sensitive hashing
 Log-linear model
 Logistic model tree
 Low-rank approximation
 Low-rank matrix approximations
 MATLAB
 MIMIC (immunology)
 MXNet
 Mallet (software project)
 Manifold regularization
 Margin-infused relaxed algorithm
 Margin classifier
 Mark V. Shaney
 Massive Online Analysis
 Matrix regularization
 Matthews correlation coefficient
 Mean shift
 Mean squared error
 Mean squared prediction error
 Measurement invariance
 Medoid
 MeeMix
 Melomics
 Memetic algorithm
 Meta-optimization
 Mexican International Conference on Artificial Intelligence
 Michael Kearns (computer scientist)
 MinHash
 Mixture model
 Mlpy
 Models of DNA evolution
 Moral graph
 Mountain car problem
 Movidius
 Multi-armed bandit
 Multi-label classification
 Multi expression programming
 Multiclass classification
 Multidimensional analysis
 Multifactor dimensionality reduction
 Multilinear principal component analysis
 Multiple correspondence analysis
 Multiple discriminant analysis
 Multiple factor analysis
 Multiple sequence alignment
 Multiplicative weight update method
 Multispectral pattern recognition
 Mutation (genetic algorithm)
 MysteryVibe
 N-gram
 NOMINATE (scaling method)
 Native-language identification
 Natural Language Toolkit
 Natural evolution strategy
 Nearest-neighbor chain algorithm
 Nearest centroid classifier
 Nearest neighbor search
 Neighbor joining
 Nest Labs
 NetMiner
 NetOwl
 Neural Designer
 Neural Engineering Object
 Neural Lab
 Neural modeling fields
 Neural network software
 NeuroSolutions
 Neuro Laboratory
 Neuroevolution
 Neuroph
 Niki.ai
 Noisy channel model
 Noisy text analytics
 Nonlinear dimensionality reduction
 Novelty detection
 Nuisance variable
 One-class classification
 Onnx
 OpenNLP
 Optimal discriminant analysis
 Oracle Data Mining
 Orange (software)
 Ordination (statistics)
 Overfitting
 PROGOL
 PSIPRED
 Pachinko allocation
 PageRank
 Parallel metaheuristic
 Parity benchmark
 Part-of-speech tagging
 Particle swarm optimization
 Path dependence
 Pattern language (formal languages)
 Peltarion Synapse
 Perplexity
 Persian Speech Corpus
 Picas (app)
 Pietro Perona
 Pipeline Pilot
 Piranha (software)
 Pitman–Yor process
 Plate notation
 Polynomial kernel
 Pop music automation
 Population process
 Portable Format for Analytics
 Predictive Model Markup Language
 Predictive state representation
 Preference regression
 Premature convergence
 Principal geodesic analysis
 Prior knowledge for pattern recognition
 Prisma (app)
 Probabilistic Action Cores
 Probabilistic context-free grammar
 Probabilistic latent semantic analysis
 Probabilistic soft logic
 Probability matching
 Probit model
 Product of experts
 Programming with Big Data in R
 Proper generalized decomposition
 Pruning (decision trees)
 Pushpak Bhattacharyya
 Q methodology
 Qloo
 Quality control and genetic algorithms
 Quantum Artificial Intelligence Lab
 Queueing theory
 Quick, Draw!
 R (programming language)
 Rada Mihalcea
 Rademacher complexity
 Radial basis function kernel
 Rand index
 Random indexing
 Random projection
 Random subspace method
 Ranking SVM
 RapidMiner
 Rattle GUI
 Raymond Cattell
 Reasoning system
 Regularization perspectives on support vector machines
 Relational data mining
 Relationship square
 Relevance vector machine
 Relief (feature selection)
 Renjin
 Repertory grid
 Representer theorem
 Reward-based selection
 Richard Zemel
 Right to explanation
 RoboEarth
 Robust principal component analysis
 RuleML Symposium
 Rule induction
 Rules extraction system family
 SAS (software)
 SNNS
 SPSS Modeler
 SUBCLU
 Sample complexity
 Sample exclusion dimension
 Santa Fe Trail problem
 Savi Technology
 Schema (genetic algorithms)
 Search-based software engineering
 Selection (genetic algorithm)
 Self-Service Semantic Suite
 Semantic folding
 Semantic mapping (statistics)
 Semidefinite embedding
 Sense Networks
 Sensorium Project
 Sequence labeling
 Sequential minimal optimization
 Shattered set
 Shogun (toolbox)
 Silhouette (clustering)
 SimHash
 SimRank
 Similarity measure
 Simple matching coefficient
 Simultaneous localization and mapping
 Sinkov statistic
 Sliced inverse regression
 Snakes and Ladders
 Soft independent modelling of class analogies
 Soft output Viterbi algorithm
 Solomonoff's theory of inductive inference
 SolveIT Software
 Spectral clustering
 Spike-and-slab variable selection
 Statistical machine translation
 Statistical parsing
 Statistical semantics
 Stefano Soatto
 Stephen Wolfram
 Stochastic block model
 Stochastic cellular automaton
 Stochastic diffusion search
 Stochastic grammar
 Stochastic matrix
 Stochastic universal sampling
 Stress majorization
 String kernel
 Structural equation modeling
 Structural risk minimization
 Structured sparsity regularization
 Structured support vector machine
 Subclass reachability
 Sufficient dimension reduction
 Sukhotin's algorithm
 Sum of absolute differences
 Sum of absolute transformed differences
 Swarm intelligence
 Switching Kalman filter
 Symbolic regression
 Synchronous context-free grammar
 Syntactic pattern recognition
 TD-Gammon
 TIMIT
 Teaching dimension
 Teuvo Kohonen
 Textual case-based reasoning
 Theory of conjoint measurement
 Thomas G. Dietterich
 Thurstonian model
 Topic model
 Tournament selection
 Training, test, and validation sets
 Transiogram
 Trax Image Recognition
 Trigram tagger
 Truncation selection
 Tucker decomposition
 UIMA
 UPGMA
 Ugly duckling theorem
 Uncertain data
 Uniform convergence in probability
 Unique negative dimension
 Universal portfolio algorithm
 User behavior analytics
 VC dimension
 VIGRA
 Validation set
 Vapnik–Chervonenkis theory
 Variable-order Bayesian network
 Variable kernel density estimation
 Variable rules analysis
 Variational message passing
 Varimax rotation
 Vector quantization
 Vicarious (company)
 Viterbi algorithm
 Vowpal Wabbit
 WACA clustering algorithm
 WPGMA
 Ward's method
 Weasel program
 Whitening transformation
 Winnow (algorithm)
 Win–stay, lose–switch
 Witness set
 Wolfram Language
 Wolfram Mathematica
 Writer invariant
 Xgboost
 Yooreeka
 Zeroth (software)

Further reading 

 Trevor Hastie, Robert Tibshirani and Jerome H. Friedman (2001). The Elements of Statistical Learning, Springer. .
 Pedro Domingos (September 2015), The Master Algorithm, Basic Books, 
 Mehryar Mohri, Afshin Rostamizadeh, Ameet Talwalkar (2012). Foundations of Machine Learning, The MIT Press. .
 Ian H. Witten and Eibe Frank (2011). Data Mining: Practical machine learning tools and techniques Morgan Kaufmann, 664pp., .
 David J. C. MacKay. Information Theory, Inference, and Learning Algorithms Cambridge: Cambridge University Press, 2003. 
 Richard O. Duda, Peter E. Hart, David G. Stork (2001) Pattern classification (2nd edition), Wiley, New York, .
 Christopher Bishop (1995). Neural Networks for Pattern Recognition, Oxford University Press. .
 Vladimir Vapnik (1998). Statistical Learning Theory. Wiley-Interscience, .
 Ray Solomonoff, An Inductive Inference Machine, IRE Convention Record, Section on Information Theory, Part 2, pp., 56–62, 1957.
 Ray Solomonoff, "An Inductive Inference Machine" A privately circulated report from the 1956 Dartmouth Summer Research Conference on AI.

References

External links 

 Data Science: Data to Insights from MIT (machine learning)
 Popular online course by Andrew Ng, at Coursera. It uses GNU Octave. The course is a free version of Stanford University's actual course taught by Ng, see.stanford.edu/Course/CS229 available for free].
 mloss is an academic database of open-source machine learning software.

Machine learning
Machine learning
Computing-related lists

Machine learning